The United Communist League of Bangladesh is a political party in Bangladesh, founded in April 2013 through the merger conference of the Communist League of Bangladesh and the Workers Party of Bangladesh (reconstituted) held in Dhaka. Mosharraf Hossain Nannu is the general secretary of the party, Abdus Satter, Azizur Rahman, Ranjit Chattapadhya and Afsar Ali serve as secretariat members. The founding conference elected a 19-member Central Committee.

References

Communist parties in Bangladesh
Political parties established in 2013